Tumelo Thandokuhle Mathebula (born 24 October 1992), professionally known as Tweezy, is a South African record producer and rapper from Johannesburg, South Africa.

Early life and career 
Tumelo Mathebula moved to Johannesburg in the Gauteng Province after the passing of his parents at the age of 6. He was introduced to a music making software called FL Studio in grade 10 which he thought was a "music making game", he later discovered that it was in fact a music making software.

He joined a music group called "Ghetto Prophecy" that consisted of 8 members. The group produced a song called "Oh My"  which ranked number 16 on the top 40 songs of YFM and was played frequently on Metro FM as well as 5FM in 2011. The group unfortunately disbanded because of the lack of funding which is when Tweezy decided to venture into the music industry as a producer.

In 2014 Tweezy was nominated for producer of the year at the SA Hip Hop Awards 2014. He was nominated again the following year for the same award and won producer of the year at the SA Hip Hop Award 2015. He was named producer of the year by Hype Magazine, a local hip hop magazine. He released his first solo single titled "Ambitions" which charted number two on YFM's Urban Top 40. He later on released a remix for the single which features South Africa rapper Khuli Chana, Nigerian artist Ice Prince and singer-songwriter Victoria Kimani

Singles

As lead artist

Production discography

Singles produced

Awards and nominations

References

External links 

1992 births
Living people
People from Gauteng
South African rappers
South African hip hop musicians
South African record producers